This List of University of East Anglia alumni includes graduates and non-graduate former students of the University of East Anglia. The list includes one current monarch and former Prime Minister, two de facto heads of state, one Vice President, one Deputy Prime Minister, and two former Leaders of the House of Lords. The list also includes two Nobel laureates in Physiology or Medicine, one President of the Royal Society, two Lasker Award winners, and a further 11 Fellows of the Royal Society. Literary alumni include one Nobel laureate in Literature, three Booker Prize winners, 11 Costa Book Award (formerly Whitbread Award) winners, and three Caine Prize winners.

Politics and government

Heads of state and government

United Kingdom

Europe

Middle East

Asia

Oceania

Americas

Africa

Diplomats

Science and academia

Science and public health

Other academics

Academic administrators

Literature

Booker Prize winners

Costa Book Award winners

Caine Prize winners

Other writers

Arts

Actors

Comedy

Film and television

Visual arts

Arts administrators

Music

Media

Newsreaders and correspondents

Radio

Media executives

Other media personalities

Activism and charity

Business

Economists

Law

Armed forces

Policing and intelligence services

Religion

Sport

References

University of East Anglia
 
East Anglia
University